This is a list of football (soccer) clubs in Saint Barthélemy.

 AJOE
 ASPSB
 FC Amicale (ex FC Beach-Hôtel)
 FC ASCCO
 FC Diables Rouges
 AS Gustavia
 FC Gustavia
 Young Stars
 Fc Ounalao

Saint Barthelemy
 
Football clubs

Football clubs